Kim Je-deok (born 12 April 2004) is a South Korean archer. He is a two-time Olympic gold medalist, winning in the mixed team and men's team events at the 2020 Summer Olympics.He was the youngest archer competing at the 2020 Summer Olympics.

Career 
Kim got into archery in 2013 when he was nine. After an appearance  on SBS's variety show "Finding Genius" in 2016 at the age of 12, he was nicknamed as " Archery Genius ".

He participated in 2019 World Archery Youth Championships, received attention by winning a gold medal in the team event and a bronze medal in the individual event.

At the end of 2019, in the national selection for the 2020 Tokyo Olympics, he placed 14th in the first round, but withdrew from the competition due to shoulder impingement syndrome. However, in March 2020, as the Tokyo Olympics were delayed by one year due to the pandemic of COVID-19, Kim recovered from his injury and was able to participate again in the national team competition held in 2021. He participated in the national team selection at the Gwangju International Archery Center on March 27, 2021, succeeded in getting into the national team by placing 5th.Then, in the Tokyo Olympic national team selection match held on April 23rd, he finished third and was promoted to the Tokyo Olympic team. This was the youngest record among male archers participating in the Olympics.

At 2020 Summer Olympics, Kim scored 688 points in the men’s ranking round, beating the world record holder Brady Ellison of the United States (682 points) to take first place. He paired with An San in mixed team competition. The two became  " Olympic Champions " after defeating Steve Wijler and Gabriela Schloesser of the Netherlands in the final round. Meanwhile, in the semifinals of the mixed team event, the so-called 'Robin Hood arrow', in which an arrow from An San penetrates the arrow fired by Kim Je-deok, drew attention. The arrows were donated by the International Olympic Committee along with the uniforms of the two athletes and displayed at the IOC Olympic Museum in Lausanne, Switzerland. At the age of 17 years and 3 months, he became the youngest medalist in Korean men’s archery history. He won second gold medal in men's team event, with his senior archers, Oh Jin-hyek and Kim Woo-jin.Despite his goal to win third gold medal in individual round, he lost to Florian Unruh of Germany by the set score of 7-3 in the round of 32. Although he wasn't able to place himself on the podium, by the end of the Olympics, Kim Je Deok gained fame as the guy who passionated cheered "Fighting" 15 different times to cheer for his teammates.

Awards and nominations

2004 births
Living people
South Korean male archers
Archers at the 2020 Summer Olympics
Olympic archers of South Korea
Olympic gold medalists for South Korea
Olympic medalists in archery
Medalists at the 2020 Summer Olympics
21st-century South Korean people

References